Kapchorwa is a town in the Eastern Region of Uganda. It is the main municipal, commercial, and administrative center of Kapchorwa District. Initially the present day Kapchorwa was known as the Sebei Region.

Location
It is also approximately 77km from the Suam Kenya-Uganda Border to the east.The coordinates of the town are 1°24'00.0"N 34°27'00.0"E (latitude:1.4000; longitude: 34.4500).

Demographics
During the 2002 national population census, Kapchorwa's population was estimated at 8,700. In 2010, the Uganda Bureau of Statistics (UBOS) estimated the population at 12,300. In 2011, UBOS estimated the mid-year population at 12,900.

Points of interest
The following points of interest lie within the town limits or close to the edges of the town:

 headquarters of Kapchorwa District Administration
 offices of Kapchorwa Town Council
 mobile branch of PostBank Uganda
 Kapchorwa central market
 Town View Secondary School, a middle school (grades 8 - 11)
 Kapchorwa Senior Secondary School
 Kapchorwa police station
 Centenary Bank, Kapchorwa Branch
 Stanbic Bank Uganda Limited
 Kapchorwa General Hospital, a 150-bed public hospital administered by Uganda Ministry of Health
 From Coach to Coach headquarters

See also
 List of hospitals in Uganda
 List of cities and towns in Uganda

References

External links
Kapchorwa District Profile

Populated places in Eastern Region, Uganda
Kapchorwa District
Sebei sub-region